The 1997 Sydney to Hobart Yacht Race, sponsored by Telstra, was the 53rd annual running of the "blue water classic" Sydney to Hobart Yacht Race. As in past editions of the race, it was hosted by the Cruising Yacht Club of Australia based in Sydney, New South Wales.  As with previous Sydney to Hobart Yacht Races, the 1997 edition began on Sydney Harbour, at noon on Boxing Day (26 December 1997), before heading south for 630 nautical miles (1,170 km) through the Tasman Sea, past Bass Strait, into Storm Bay and up the River Derwent, to cross the finish line in Hobart, Tasmania. 

The 1997 fleet comprised 115 starters of which 99 completed the race and 16 yachts retired.

Results

Line Honours results (Top 10)

Handicap results (Top 10)

References

Sydney to Hobart Yacht Race
S
Sydney to Hobart Yacht Race
Sydney to Hobart Yacht Race
Sydney to Hobart Yacht Race